Mineola station may refer to:

Mineola station (Texas), an Amtrak station in Mineola, Texas
Mineola station (LIRR), a Long Island Rail Road station in Mineola, New York